Tim Lemperle (born 5 February 2002) is a German professional footballer who plays as a winger for Bundesliga club 1. FC Köln.

Club career
Lemperle began his career at TuS Makkabi Frankfurt. After stints in the youth academies of Mainz 05 and FSV Frankfurt, he joined 1.FC Köln in the summer of 2017. In early 2020, he was promoted to the club's first squad. In May 2020, it was announced that Lemperle had signed his first professional contract that would keep him at the club until July 2023. In February 2023, his contract was extended until July 2025.

International career
Lemperle has represented Germany's youth squads, beginning with the association's U17 team. Since 2020, he has appeared for his country's U19 squad.

References

External links
 
 
 
 

2002 births
Living people
German footballers
Footballers from Frankfurt
Association football forwards
Germany under-21 international footballers
Germany youth international footballers
Bundesliga players
Regionalliga players
1. FC Köln players
1. FC Köln II players